Dudley East was a parliamentary constituency, centred on the town of Dudley in the West Midlands. It returned one Member of Parliament (MP)  to the House of Commons of the Parliament of the United Kingdom by the first past the post system.

The constituency was created for the February 1974 general election, and abolished for the 1997 general election.

History
Throughout its history, it was served by one member: John Gilbert of the Labour Party.

Boundaries
1974–1983: The County Borough of Dudley wards of Castle, Coseley East, Coseley West, Netherton and Woodside, Priory, St Andrew's, St James's, and St Thomas's.

1983–1997: The Metropolitan Borough of Dudley wards of Castle and Priory, Coseley East, Coseley West, Netherton and Woodside, Quarry Bank and Cradley, St Andrew's, St James's, and St Thomas's.

Dudley East was one of three constituencies in the Metropolitan Borough of Dudley, covering as its name suggested the eastern part of the town of Dudley, including the town centre, along with Coseley and parts of Sedgley. At abolition in 1997, both Dudley East and Dudley West were replaced by two new constituencies: Dudley North and Dudley South, with some constituents being transferred to the re-created Stourbridge constituency.

Members of Parliament

Elections

Elections in the 1990s

Elections in the 1980s

Elections in the 1970s

See also 
 List of parliamentary constituencies in Dudley

Notes and references 

Politics of Dudley
Parliamentary constituencies in the West Midlands (county) (historic)
Constituencies of the Parliament of the United Kingdom established in 1974
Constituencies of the Parliament of the United Kingdom disestablished in 1997